World Table Tennis, stylized as WTT, is an organization created by the ITTF in 2019 that runs commercialized table tennis tournaments. Its inaugural tournament was held in November 2020 in Macao, China (known as WTT Macao). It is distinguished from the ordinary ITTF World Tour by various rules changes and big prize money for commercialized purposes. The head of its council is Liu Guoliang, a former Olympic gold medalist and former head coach of China.

Background
In 1926, The ITTF was founded by William Henry Lawes of Wymondham, the nine founding members being Austria, Czechoslovakia, Denmark, England, Germany, Hungary, India, Sweden and Wales. The first international tournament was held in January 1926 in Berlin while the first World Table Tennis Championships was held in December 1926 in London. It was the only event for over 50 years that was ran and managed commercially by the ITTF.

In 1980, the ITTF World Cups was introduced followed by the ITTF World Tour in 1996. Up till 2000, commercial rights for these events were passed on to the local organising committees (LOC) but a different approach was taken to centralise rights through the creation of  TMS. TMS was tasked to manage these rights on behalf of ITTF up till 2017 when ITTF decided to buy back the rights to be taken in house.

In 2018, professional consultants Deloitte and Withers were engaged to assist with remodelling the way that the ITTF does business. Through full models and financial understanding of our events and other worldwide properties, ITTF sought to understand the untapped commercial potential of Table Tennis. One key finding led to the idea of separation between the management of the professional and institutional structures of table tennis.

On 30 May 2019, ITTF announced the idea of World Table Tennis (WTT). WTT was to become the brand new commercial vehicle to drive success in the revolution and professionalisation of table tennis. To manage the set up of WTT, the ITTF executive committee appointed a selection panel. The appointed selection panel included ITTF President Thomas Weikert, ITTF Deputy President Khalil Al-Mohannadi, ITTF Executive Vice President for Finance Petra Sorling, ITTF CEO Steve Dainton, and ITTF Marketing Director Matthew Pound.

WTT also announced the hire of Philippe Le Floc’h, former Chief Commercial Officer at FIFA and marketing director at UEFA, as Senior Commercial Strategy Consultant, in line with WTT's aim to commercialise the sport. Shortly after, Stephen Duckitt, who has 15 years of sports management experience, primarily with WTA and ATP, was announced as WTT Event Strategy Director.

Next to join was Melissa Soobratty. Announced on 4 December 2020, the former vice president, Media at Football Marketing Asia joined as WTT Senior Media Director to oversee all areas related to content, to further professionalise the organisation's expanding media operations.

WTT event structure

Grand Smash  
The Grand Smashes will become the pillars of the sport and the most important events in the table tennis calendar. The events will feature both Men's and Women's singles draws with more players now receiving automatic entry into events. There will be fewer seeded players and a separate qualifying draw to ensure that the excitement kicks off right from the start. Doubles and Mixed Doubles events will also be played during the Grand Smashes.Dates: Fixed dates on the annual WTT Calendar

Players: 64 Men's & Women's Singles, Doubles & Mixed doubles draw

Length of event: 10 Days + Qualification

Prize Pool: Up to US$ 3 million

Number of events: Up to 4

Singapore Smash

Past winners

Budapest Smash

Past winners

WTT Series  
The WTT Series will serve as the platform for all professional players to compete internationally. The series is split up into 3 tiers to give the athletes adequate playing opportunities: Cup Finals, Champion Series and the Contender Series. WTT aims to hold these events in unique venues around the world that include theatres, bars, clubs, stadiums and more to create a unique, interesting and intimate opportunity for fans to interact with the athletes.

WTT Cup Finals 
The WTT Cup Finals are split into Men's and Women's events that will be held separately. The top 16 players of the year will qualify for this year-end event together with the best 8 pairs. Qualification will be determined by the player's performance throughout the WTT season and reflected through their Table Tennis World Ranking. The winners of the WTT Cup Finals will win the prestigious ITTF World Cup trophies.

Players: 16 in Men's & Women's Singles, Top 8 pair in doubles

Length of event: 5 days

Prize Pool: Up to US$1.5million each

Number of events: 2

Medalists

Men's singles

Women's singles

WTT Champions Series 
The WTT Champion Series is exclusive to the top 32 men and women in the world. Four separate men's and women's event will be held with up to US$5million up for grabs. The matches will be played on one table to ensure that the best TV production and best entertainment is presented to fans.

Players: 32 Men's & Women's Singles

Length of event: 6 days

Prize Pool: Up to US$5million

Number of events: 4 men & 4 women

WTT Contender Series 
The WTT Contender Series is split into two categories, WTT Star Contender & WTT Contender, and will include both men's and women's competition at each event. It will form the cornerstone of the new WTT professional tour where most players will play. The Contender Series will provide opportunities for future and emerging stars while attracting top player to compete for prize money and Table Tennis World Ranking points.

WTT Star Contenders 
WTT Star Contenders will consist of 6 events throughout the year featuring 48 men and 48 women. These events will serve as the platform for the next best in the world to earn ranking points to make the step up into the WTT Champions Series.

Players: 48 Men's & Women's Singles

Length of event: 6 days + Qualification

Number of events: 6

WTT Contenders 
Then the final tier, the WTT Contenders, allows the rest of the professional players throughout the world rankings to develop their talents in up to 14 events per year, each one lasting for four days of adrenaline-filled action.

Players: Flexible playing system

Length of event: Flexible playing system

Number of events: Up to 14 events

WTT Feeder
https://worldtabletennis.com/news?search=WTT%20Feeder

WTT Youth Contender Series
https://worldtabletennis.com/eventslist

U11-U13-U15-U17-U19

WTT Council 
On 29 June 2020, WTT announced that current China Table Tennis Association President, Liu Guoliang accepted the role as Chair of the WTT Council. The WTT Council is tasked to ensure the healthy development of WTT and be at the helm of the future development of table tennis.

The WTT Council will consist of key stakeholders in the global game, including but not limited to; players both past and present, crucial contributors to international table tennis, event hosts and ITTF personnel. The WTT Council serves to represent the views of all key table tennis stakeholders worldwide.

Additional members of the WTT Council have not been announced yet.

WTT Macao 
WTT Macao was announced on 11 September 2020 to be held between 25 and 29 November 2020. The debut event was a promotional showcase featuring 16 of the world's best male and 16 of the world's best female paddlers. The event implemented a brand new format with innovative scoring methods. It also featured a prize purse of US$800,000 with players paid a minimum of US$15,000, earning more prize money per match they win.

References

Table tennis competitions
Table tennis
Recurring sporting events established in 2020